Softball at the 2018 Central American and Caribbean Games was held from the 20 to 26 July for the women's tournament, and from  27 July to 2 August for the men's tournament. Both tournaments were held at the Little League Stadium in Barranquilla, Colombia.

Medal summary

Qualification

Men

Women

Men's tournament

Group stage

Playoff round

Semifinals

Final

Grand Final

Final standing

Women's tournament

Group stage

Playoff round

Semifinals

Final

Grand Final

Final standing

References

External links
2018 Central American and Caribbean Games – Softball

2018 Central American and Caribbean Games events
Central American and Caribbean Games
Softball at the Central American and Caribbean Games
Central American and Caribbean Games